The Iceland women's national volleyball team represents Iceland in international women's volleyball competitions and friendly matches.

References

References
 Icelandic Volleyball Association
2013 Squad

National women's volleyball teams
Volleyball
Volleyball in Iceland